Law on Use of Languages and Scripts of National Minorities is law which defines use of minority languages in Croatia. Additionally Croatian Constitutional law on national minorities rights and The Law on Education in language and script of national minorities explicitly define rights on usage of minority languages in Croatia.

Rights

Local governments to which this law applies (Municipalities of Croatia with at least one third of members of ethnic minority or municipality where right is defined by international agreement) are required to explicitly prescribe equal official use of minority language or script throughout its territory, regulate in detail realization of those rights and expressly prescribe all particular rights guaranteed by Law on Use of Languages and Scripts of National Minorities. They are required to define these rights in their local statutes.

Implementation
In April 2015 United Nations Human Rights Committee has urged Croatia to ensure the right of minorities to use their language and alphabet. Committee report stated that particularly concerns the use of Serbian Cyrillic in the town of Vukovar and municipalities concerned.

See also
2013 Anti-Cyrillic protests in Croatia
European Charter for Regional or Minority Languages

References

Law of Croatia
National human rights instruments
Minority rights
Linguistic rights
Language policy in Bosnia and Herzegovina, Croatia, Montenegro and Serbia
Languages of Croatia